The following is a timeline of the presidency of John F. Kennedy from January 1, 1963, to November 22, 1963, upon his assassination and death.

January 

 January 10 – President Kennedy meets with President-elect Juan Bosch of the Dominican Republic.
 January 11 – President Kennedy meets with Labor Secretary W. Willard Wirtz and AFL–CIO President George Meany.
 January 12 – President Kennedy announces the appointment of David L. Lawrence as Chairman of the President's Committee on Equal Opportunity in Housing. Kennedy also appoints Phil N. Bornstein as Federal Housing Commissioner.
 January 14 – President Kennedy delivers his third (and final) State of the Union address.
 January 31 – President Kennedy selects Franklin D. Roosevelt, Jr. for United States Undersecretary of Commerce. RFK denies government pressure is preventing Teamster union officials from getting their required bonds. President Kennedy sends a message to Capitol Hill for the government to pay the cotton trade to increase sales of domestic cotton alongside the government paying the feed grain and dairy farmers to not produce.

February 
 February 10 – The President and the First Lady attend the revue Beyond the Fringe in New York City.
 February 20 – In a letter to Attorney General Robert F. Kennedy, President Kennedy denies clemency to Victor Feguer, a convicted murderer.

March 
 March 15 – Victor Feguer is executed after Kennedy's February 20 denial of clemency. The execution marks the last federal execution until the execution of Timothy McVeigh on June 11, 2001.
March 18–20 – President Kennedy makes the seventh international trip of his presidency, travelling to San José, Costa Rica, where he attends the Conference of Presidents of the Central American Republics.

April

May

June 

 June 10 – President Kennedy delivers the commencement address at American University in Washington, D.C.
 June 11 – President Kennedy delivers the Civil Rights Address in the aftermath of the Birmingham campaign and recent Stand in the Schoolhouse Door incident and further calls for legislation to enact a civil rights bill.
June 23-July 2 – Kennedy makes the eighth international trip of his presidency.
June 23–25 – Visits Cologne, Frankfurt, and Wiesbaden, West Germany; also holds meetings with West German Chancellor Konrad Adenauer and other officials.
 June 26 – Visits West Berlin and delivers his now-famous "Ich bin ein Berliner" speech advocating representative democracy and capitalism as a replacement for communist regimes around the world.
June 26–29 – Visits Dublin, Wexford, Cork, Galway, and Limerick, Ireland and visits his ancestral home; also addresses the Oireachtas (parliament).
June 29–30 – Travels to the United Kingdom for an informal visit with British Harold Macmillan at his home in West Sussex, England.

July 
July 1–2 – Travels to Naples and Rome, Italy, where he meets with Italian President Antonio Segni, and NATO officials.
July 2 – Has an audience with the newly elected Pope Paul VI at the Apostolic Palace in Vatican City.
July 24 – President Kennedy meets with a group of Boys Nation senators, including future U.S. President Bill Clinton, at the White House.

August 
August 7 – Patrick Bouvier Kennedy, President and Mrs. Kennedy's third child, is born (five-and-a-half weeks prematurely) at the Otis Air Force Base Hospital in Bourne, Massachusetts. Shortly after birth, he develops symptoms of hyaline membrane disease, now called infant respiratory distress syndrome.
August 9 – Patrick Bouvier Kennedy dies at Boston Children's Hospital.
 August 28 – The March on Washington for Jobs and Freedom occurs in Washington, D.C., culminating in the now-famous "I Have A Dream" speech by Martin Luther King Jr. Estimates of the number of marchers range from 200,000 to 300,000. After the march, King meets with President Kennedy, alongside other civil rights activists.

September 
 September 20 – Address before the United Nations General Assembly (JFK's second) stating various specific recommendations to "move the world to a just and lasting peace".
 September 28 – Dedication of Clair A. Hill Whiskeytown Dam just outside Redding, California in Shasta County. Kennedy touted the reservoir as the largest of the Trinity County Dams" that "could be used to benefit the farms and lands further south."

October 

 October 3 – President Kennedy visits Cleburne County, Arkansas, to dedicate the Greers Ferry Dam. This is the last major public appearance before he was shot in Dallas.
 October 7 – President Kennedy signs the Partial Test Ban Treaty, prohibiting all nuclear weapons testing providing an exception for underground nuclear testing only.
 October 8 – President Kennedy announces an agreement with the Soviet Union to open negotiations for the sale of American wheat.
 October 11 – President Kennedy approves the recommendations made by Secretary of Defense Robert S. McNamara, and Chairman of the Joint Chiefs of Staff General Maxwell Taylor, and outlined in National Security Action Memoranda (NSAM 263, South Vietnam), to (1) conclude a complete US military withdrawal from Vietnam by December 31, 1965; (2) that the first of these troops, numbering 1,000, will have left Vietnam by December 31, 1963; (3) that a public announcement will be issued, to set these decisions in concrete.

November 
 November 4 – In a private dictation at the Oval Office, following the assassination of South Vietnam President Diem, President Kennedy admits that the US Government had been discussing for three months the implementation of a coup d'état in S. Vietnam, with both dissenting and approving views, and which, at length, the plan to depose the leader of S. Vietnam had been authorised and approved by President Kennedy.      
 November 14 – President Kennedy attends a dedication ceremony at the border of Maryland and Delaware marking the completion of the Northeast Expressway and the Delaware Turnpike, which together form part of Interstate 95 and provided a limited-access route between Baltimore and the approach to the Delaware Memorial Bridge. Both roads were renamed the John F. Kennedy Memorial Highway a month later following his assassination. 
 November 18 – President Kennedy travels to Tampa, Florida. There, he visited the military's Strike Command Headquarters, attended a luncheon at the officer's club, made a speech at the Florida Chamber of Commerce, and another to the United Steelworker's Union.
 November 21 – President Kennedy asks his economic advisers to prepare the War on Poverty for 1964. Less than two months after the President's assassination, President Johnson introduces the legislation in his first State of the Union address on January 8, 1964, and two of the major pieces of related legislation – the Economic Opportunity Act of 1964 and the Social Security Act of 1965 – are signed into law on August 20, 1964, and July 30, 1965, respectively.
 November 22 – President Kennedy and Texas Governor John Connally are shot at 12:30 p.m. CST (18:30 UTC) in Dealey Plaza, Dallas, Texas. They are rushed to Parkland Memorial Hospital, where Kennedy is pronounced dead at 1:00 p.m. CST (19:00 UTC). Lee Harvey Oswald is arrested and charged with the murder. Oswald is shot and killed two days later by nightclub owner Jack Ruby.

 November 22 – Vice President Lyndon B. Johnson succeeds to the presidency and is sworn in aboard Air Force One.
 November 23–25 – State funeral of John F. Kennedy
 November 23 – Kennedy lies in repose in the White House East Room for a period of 24 hours. At 4:45 pm, President Johnson issues Proclamation 3561, declaring November 25, the day of the funeral service, to be a national day of mourning.
 November 24 – Kennedy lies in state in the Capitol rotunda for a period of 18 hours. NBC broadcasts live uninterrupted coverage of people paying their respects at the president's casket during the overnight hours.
 November 25 – A funeral mass is held at St. Matthew's Cathedral commemorating the life of John F. Kennedy. Dignitaries from over 90 countries attend the service.
 November 25 – President Kennedy is laid to rest at Arlington National Cemetery. Upon the request of the now-former First Lady Jacqueline Kennedy on the day before, an eternal flame, inspired by the Tomb of the Unknown Soldier at the Arc de Triomphe in Paris, known later as the John F. Kennedy Eternal Flame, is set up by the United States Army Corps of Engineers, and first lit by Mrs. Kennedy.

See also

 Timeline of the John F. Kennedy presidency, for an index of the Kennedy presidency timeline articles

References

External links 
 Miller Center Kennedy Presidential Timeline

1963 in the United States
1963